The 3rd constituency of the Loir-et-Cher (French: Troisième circonscription de Loir-et-Cher) is a French legislative constituency in the Seine-Maritime département. Like the other 576 French constituencies, it elects one MP using a two round electoral system.

Description

The 3rd Constituency of the Loir-et-Cher covers the north west of the department including the medieval town of Vendôme on the Loir river.

The seat has consistently returned deputies from the centre right.

Assembly Members

Election results

2022

 
 
 
 
 
|-
| colspan="8" bgcolor="#E9E9E9"|
|-

2017

2012

References

3